Kadama is a town in Kibuku District, in the Eastern Region of Uganda.

Location
The coordinates of Kadama are 01°01'00.0"N, 33°52'49.0"E (Latitude:1.016667; Longitude:33.880278).

Overview
Kadama is a rapidly expending urban center, attracting new people from within and from without Kibuku District. Kadama Health Centre IV, Provides free public health services. Despite the presence of national grid electricity, the absence of piped water, lack of garbage collection services and the presence of noise pollution, on account of an inordinate number of bars and night clubs, pose public health challenges.

Population
In 2018, the population of Kadama Municipality was estimated in excess of 10,000 people.

References

External links
Baby boom in rural areas as family planning stalls As of 18 September 2017.
Funding gaps limit contraceptives use As of 26 September 2017.

Populated places in Eastern Region, Uganda
Cities in the Great Rift Valley
Kibuku District